Bechi Lungeli is a Nepalese politician. She is a member of Provincial Assembly of Madhesh Province from CPN (Unified Socialist). Lungeli, a resident of Lalbandi, was elected via 2017 Nepalese provincial elections from Sarlahi 1(B).

Electoral history

2017 Nepalese provincial elections

References

Living people
1978 births
Madhesi people
21st-century Nepalese women politicians
21st-century Nepalese politicians
Members of the Provincial Assembly of Madhesh Province
Communist Party of Nepal (Unified Socialist) politicians